Jeszcze Więcej Seksistowskich Piosenek (Even More Sexist Songs) is the second album released by Polish punk rock band Anti Dread.

Track listing
italicised titles in brackets are translated from Polish.
 "Wypłata" (Payment)
 "Pierwszy raz" (First Time)
 originally performed by The Boys
 "Wibrator" (Vibrator)
 "Kuloodporny" (Bullet Proof)
 "Hydraulik" (Plumber)
 "Sobotnia noc" (Saturday's Night)
 "Kingston Radio"
 "Nieprzystosowany" (Ill-adapted)
 "Weekend"
 originally performed by The Boys
 "Miłość to..." (Love Is...)
 "Punk rockowa dziewczyna" (Punk Rock Girl)
 "Dzień i noc" (Day and Night)
 "Chciałbym być twoim chłopakiem" (I Wanna Be Your Boyfriend)
 originally performed by The Ramones
 "Stara zabawa" (Old Fun)
 "Dwa serca" (Two Hearts)
 "Kingston Radio - Banach version"

Bonus
 "Sobotnia noc - clip"

Personnel
Paweł Czekała - guitar
Kanister - drums
Piotr Półtorak - vocals
Dydas - guitar
Mirosław Lipniewski - bass guitar

External links
  Anti Dread official website
  Jimmy Jazz Records

2005 albums
Anti Dread albums
Polish-language albums